This is a list of video games based on DC Comics.

Video games

1970s–80s

1990s

2000s

2010s

2020s

See also
List of video games based on comics
List of video games featuring Batman
List of video games featuring Superman
Marvel Games

References 

Video games based on DC Comics, List of
DC Comics
 
Video games based on DC Comics, List of